Warren Hastings Miller (c. 1878 – July 14, 1960) was an American editor of the magazine Field & Stream, an avid camper and designer, and the author of at least 32 books ranging from outdoor guides to pulp fiction. He designed, described, and used the first Forester tent.

Reprinted fiction
 Raider of the Seas: Captain Jim Colvin and the Log of the Pulo Siburu (Black Dog Books, 2011)
 High Adventure #152 (reprints Far East stories)
 High Adventure #172 (reprints Foreign Legion Stories: The Hell’s Angels Squad)
 High Adventure #177 (reprints war stories)

References

1870s births
1960 deaths
People from Honesdale, Pennsylvania
Stevens Institute of Technology alumni
American non-fiction writers